A rat race is an endless, self-defeating, or pointless pursuit. The phrase equates humans to rats attempting to earn a reward such as cheese, in vain. It may also refer to a competitive struggle to get ahead financially or routinely.

The term is commonly associated with an exhausting, repetitive lifestyle that leaves no time for relaxation or enjoyment.

Etymology
The earliest known occurrence is 1934. In reference to aviation training a rat race was originally a "follow-the-leader" game in which a trainee fighter pilot had to copy all the actions (loops, rolls, spins, Immelmann turns etc.) performed by an experienced pilot. From 1945, the phrase took on the meaning of "competitive struggle."

Historical usage
The Rat Race was used as a title for a novel written by Jay Franklin in 1947 for Colliers Magazine and first published in book form in 1950. It is dedicated To those few rats in Washington who do not carry brief-cases.
The term "rat race" was used in an article about Samuel Goudsmit published in 1953 entitled: A Farewell to String and Sealing Wax~I in which Daniel Lang wrote,

Philip K. Dick used the term in "The Last of the Masters", published in 1954:

Jim Bishop used the term rat race in his book The Golden Ham: A Candid Biography of Jackie Gleason. The term occurs in a letter Jackie Gleason wrote to his wife in which he says: "Television is a rat race, and remember this, even if you win you are still a rat."
William H. Whyte used the term rat race in The Organization Man:

Solutions 
"Escaping the rat race" can have a number of different meanings:
 Movement from work or geographical location into (typically) a more rural area
 Retirement, quitting or ceasing work
 Moving from a job of high strenuosity to one of lesser strenuosity, like the tang ping lifestyle of young Chinese
 Adopting a Buddha-like mindset
 Changing to a different job altogether
 Remote work
 Becoming financially independent from an employer
 Living in harmony with nature
 Developing an inner attitude of detachment from materialistic pursuits
 Alienation from the norms of society

Music 
 "Slave to the Wage" by English alternative rock band Placebo is a song that describes the classical Rat Race, on the 2000 album Black Market Music.
 "Escape (Free Yo Mind From This Rat Race)" was released as the b-side of "Glam Slam", the second single from Prince's album Lovesexy and was later included on The B-Sides compilation.
"Rat Race" by English ska band The Specials
"Mice Race" by British Anarcho-punk/Deathrock band Rudimentary Peni.
Rat Race Devil's Playground by Billy Idol (2005)
Rat Race Rastaman Vibration by Bob Marley (1976)
Rat Race by Babbu Maan (album Pagal Shayar-2020)
The Clockwise Witness by DeVotchKa is a song that describes the futility of Rat Race (album A Mad & Faithful Telling-2008)
Even if You Win, You're Still a Rat by Architects (2012)
 RatRace by English metal band Skindred (2007)
 The Racing Rats by English rock band Editors (2007)

See also
 Economic sociology
 The Myth of Sisyphus, an essay by Albert Camus
 Sisyphus, a Greek mythological figure
 Work–life balance
 Crab bucket

References

Further reading
Leaving the Mother Ship by Randall M. Craig (Knowledge to Action Press, 2004).

1930s neologisms
English phrases
Workplace
Criticism of economic growth
Metaphors referring to animals
Economics catchphrases